Eva Juřeníková (born 24 November 1978 in Ostrava) is a Czech orienteering competitor currently living in Borlänge, Sweden.

She competed at the 2009 World Orienteering Championships in Miskolc, where she placed 5th in the relay with the Czech team. She is Junior World Champion in relay from 1995.

References

External links
 
 Eva Juřeníková at World of O Runners

1978 births
Living people
Sportspeople from Ostrava
Sportspeople from the Moravian-Silesian Region
Czech orienteers
Female orienteers
Foot orienteers
World Orienteering Championships medalists
Junior World Orienteering Championships medalists